Alex Rosenberg may refer to:

 Alexander Rosenberg (born 1946), American philosopher and novelist
 Alex F. T. W. Rosenberg (1926–2007), German-American mathematician
 Alexander L. Rosenberg (1946–2012), Russian-American mathematician
 Alex Rosenberg (basketball) (born 1991), American Israeli basketball player

See also
 Aleksandr Rosenberg (1877–1935), Russian architect and author
 Aleksandr Rozenberg] (b. 1967), Transnistrian politician